Norbert A'Campo (born 1941) is a Swiss mathematician working on singularity theory. He earned a doctorate in 1972 from the University of Paris-Sud. In 1974 he was an invited speaker at the International Congress of Mathematicians, and in 1988 he was elected president of the Swiss Mathematical Society. In 2012 he became a fellow of the American Mathematical Society.

References

Swiss mathematicians
1941 births
Living people
Fellows of the American Mathematical Society